I Can Speak is a 2017 South Korean film based on a true story of comfort women directed by Kim Hyun-seok and distributed by Lotte Entertainment. The genre of the film are both comedy and drama. The film depicts the story of the resolution of conviction for “comfort women” (HR121) of the Japanese military in 2007.  Though the film is a comedy, the genre serves as a vehicle to discuss the deeper topic of Korean  comfort women. The way that film illustrated  Na Ok-Bun's enterprising attitude of her life and her courageously testifying in front of the whole world were applauded. The film stars Na Moon-hee as Na Ok-Bun, with Lee Je-hoon as Park Min-Jae. The scene of Na Ok-Bun's testimony to the United States Congress was filmed at the Capitol Building of Virginia, in the city of Richmond.

Plot
Nah Ok-Bun is an elderly woman who is notorious for filing citizen's complaint at her district office and is nicknamed "Goblin Granny". When Ok-Bun meets Park Min Jae, a young man who has recently been appointed as a junior civil service officer, she is dissatisfied with his attitude of not caring about her complaints and only trying to do the jobs that are assigned to him.

But there is an opportunity for these two as Ok-Bun wants to learn English. The senior class run by the local resident center does not fit her level, and the class at the English academy is too fast-paced and so she is eventually kicked out of the class. Ok-Bun sees Min Jae speaking English very fluently with a native speaker in the academy. Forgetting all the troubles she had with Min Jae, Ok-Bun asks Min Jae to teach her English. Min Jae refuses Ok-Bun's request because he does not want to take on the troublesome role. When Min Jae sees Ok-Bun taking care of his younger brother, Young Jae, he is moved by her warmth and agrees to become her English teacher. Min Jae teaches Ok-Bun and Ok-Bun's English improves.

Min Jae learns that Ok-Bun wishes to learn English to continue her friend Jeong-Shim's dream of testifying at the comfort women public hearing in Washington D.C. Ok-Bun and Jeong-Shim were both victims of the Japanese Military during World War II. Although Ok-Bun has prepared what to say in the public hearing, she can hardly speak as she is overwhelmed by the pressure she feels in the unfamiliar surroundings. When people start to question Ok-Bun's behavior, she hears and sees Min Jae in the audience which gives her the courage to testify against the atrocities of the Japanese Military.

Cast

Main
Na Moon-hee as Na Ok-Bun
Choi Soo-in as young Na Ok-Bun
A frequent trouble making visitor at the local public government office who has filed over 8,000 civil complaints.
Lee Je-hoon as Park Min-jae
A ninth-level civil servant who befriends Na Ok-Bun and teaches her English

Supporting
Yeom Hye-ran as Woman from Jinju
Lee Sang-hee as Hye-jung
Son Sook as Jung-sim 
Lee Jae-in as young Jung-sim
Kim So-jin as Geum-joo 
Park Chul-min as Team leader Yang
Jung Yeon-joo as A-young
Lee Ji-hoon as Jong-hyun
Lee Dae-yeon as Borough chief
Sung Yu-bin as Park Young-jae
Woo Ji-hyun as Public service employee

Reception
I Can Speak was released in theaters in Korea on September 21, 2017. On its opening weekend it topped the local box office, grossing  from 727,000 admissions over four days. During the Korean Chuseok holiday weekend, the movie attracted 462,939 viewers, increasing the total number of ticket sale to 2.86 million. According to the Korean Film Council, just twenty days after its release, I Can Speak had attracted 3 million viewers.

The film has won the prize for the “Comfort Women” victim scenario project which was sponsored by the Ministry of Gender Equality and Family. It was selected through a competition rate of 75: 1. The film was praised for its lively approach to the issue of comfort women which is based on anger and sadness. It was also selected for family film production support of Korean Film Council.

Awards and nominations

References

External links

 
 I Can Speak Review on YBMW

2017 films
2017 comedy-drama films
South Korean comedy-drama films
Lotte Entertainment films
Films about comfort women
Films shot in Virginia
World War II war crimes trials films
2017 comedy films
2010s South Korean films